Martin Valvekens (1604 – 2 May 1682) was a Franciscan friar and historian.

Valvekens was professed as a Franciscan friar in 1628, celebrating his jubilee of fifty years on 12 June 1678.

On the basis of papers left by Jean Verdonck at his death in 1672, Valvekens edited a history of the foundation of the Franciscan house in Diest, Ortus, progressus et modernus status conventus Fratrum Minorum Diestensis. This manuscript survived the suppression of the house, and was a source for F. J. E. Raymaekers's ecclesiastical history of the town, Het kerkelijk en liefdadig Diest (1870).

Valvekens died at the age of 78, having been a Franciscan for 53 years.

References

Sources
Jérôme Goyens, "Valvekens, Martin", in Biographie Nationale, vol. 26 (Brussels, 1936-1938), 108-109.

1604 births
1682 deaths
Flemish Friars Minor
Franciscan scholars